Valentin Kononen (born 7 March 1969 in Helsinki) is a Finnish former race walker. His competitive accomplishments include winning several medals in major competitions, which ranks him as one of the top Finnish performer in his sport.

Kononen's most notable achievement was winning a gold medal in the 1995 World Championships in Athletics in Gothenburg. He also won silver medals in the 1993 World Championships in Stuttgart and the 1998 European Championships in Budapest.

Fastest 50km race results
 3.39.34 (1) Dudince March 26, 2000
 3.41.09 (3) Podebrady April 20, 1997 (World Race Walking Cup)
 3.42.02 (2) Stuttgart August 21, 1993 (World Championships)
 3.42.50 (3) Beijing April 30, 1995
 3.43.42 (1) Gothenburg August 11, 1995
 3.44.28 (2) Budapest August 21, 1998 (European Championships)
 3.45.19 (2) Naumburg April 28, 1996
 3.47.14 (7) Helsinki August 13, 1994 (European Championships)
 3.47.40 (7) Atlanta August 2, 1996 (Olympic Games)
 3.48.50 (9) Dudince April 25, 1998

Achievements

References

1969 births
Living people
Athletes from Helsinki
Finnish male racewalkers
Olympic athletes of Finland
Athletes (track and field) at the 1992 Summer Olympics
Athletes (track and field) at the 1996 Summer Olympics
Athletes (track and field) at the 2000 Summer Olympics
World Athletics Championships medalists
European Athletics Championships medalists
World Athletics Championships winners